Amphorina farrani is a species of sea slug or nudibranch, a marine gastropod mollusc in the family Eubranchidae. Several species of Eubranchus were transferred to Amphorina in 2020.

Distribution
This species was described from Malahide, Ireland. It has also been reported from the Atlantic coast of Norway and the Baltic Sea south to the Mediterranean Sea.

References

Eubranchidae
Gastropods described in 1844